Coastal City is a shopping and office complex in Nanshan District, Shenzhen, China. Located in the central business district of Nanshan, it occupies an entire city block bounded by Binhai, Nanhai, Houhai, Houhaibin and Chuangye Roads.

Overview
The complex consists of the Coastal City shopping arcade and two office buildings, namely the West (30 floors) and East (24 floors) towers. The podium of the two towers hosts numerous stores as well. The entire project stands on 6000m2 of reclaimed land, the largest of its kind in Nanshan.

Designed by the US architectural firm Callison, the mall opened in 2007 consisting five stories. It hosts the Coastal City Cinema, an ice rink, an AEON supermarket and several dozens of smaller Chinese and international shops and restaurants.

Nearby buildings
Buildings and facilities in its proximity include Heung Kong Tower, Tiley Fame City, Kempinski Shenzhen, Poly Cultural Center, Nanshan Book City, Haiya shopping mall and Shenzhen Bay Sports Center.

Transportation
A bus station (Nanshan CBD station) is located directly in front of the main entrance, it serves as the terminus for bus numbers 121, 76, 80, 231, 305, 382, 353, 322, 337, J1, 229 and 72. The complex is also within walking distance from Houhai station on Shenzhen Metro.

Gallery

References

Shopping malls in Shenzhen
Nanshan District, Shenzhen